Jaime Casagrande (18 October 1949 – 29 October 2013) was a Brazilian professional footballer who made 430 appearances for Figueirense between 1973 and 1982. Born in Urussanga, he played for the club as a defender, making 430 appearances, the second highest in the club's history.

References

1949 births
2013 deaths
Brazilian footballers
Figueirense FC players
Association football defenders